Stigmatodon apparicianus, is a species of flowering plant in the family Bromeliaceae. This species is endemic to Brazil.

References

apparicianus
Flora of Brazil